Charles E. Orr House is a historic home located at Brevard, Transylvania County, North Carolina.  It was built in 1926, and is a two-story, Tudor Revival style dwelling of uncoursed rock-faced granite.  It has a combination hip and clipped gable roof.  Also on the property is a one-story, stone veneer cottage.

It was listed on the National Register of Historic Places in 2006.  It is located in the East Main Street Historic District.

References

Houses on the National Register of Historic Places in North Carolina
Tudor Revival architecture in North Carolina
Houses completed in 1926
Houses in Transylvania County, North Carolina
National Register of Historic Places in Transylvania County, North Carolina
Historic district contributing properties in North Carolina